Scopeloberyx is a genus of ridgeheads.

Species
There are currently nine recognized species in this genus:
 Scopeloberyx bannikovi Kotlyar, 2004
 Scopeloberyx malayanus (M. C. W. Weber, 1913)
 Scopeloberyx maxillaris (Garman, 1899)
 Scopeloberyx microlepis (Norman, 1937) (Southern bigscale)
 Scopeloberyx opisthopterus (A. E. Parr, 1933)
 Scopeloberyx pequenoi Kotlyar, 2004
 Scopeloberyx robustus (Günther, 1887) (Longjaw bigscale)
 Scopeloberyx rossicus Kotlyar, 2004
 Scopeloberyx rubriventer (Koefoed, 1953)

References

Stephanoberyciformes